John Snowden Kellison (November 3, 1886 – May 7, 1971) was a professional football player in the National Football League with the Canton Bulldogs and the Toledo Maroons. He also was an athletic director at Marietta College as well as Washington & Jefferson College. He later became the head coach for William and Mary's football and basketball teams. In the 1940s he was an assistant coach, under Greasy Neale, for the Philadelphia Eagles.

Playing career
John joined the Bulldogs in 1915 along with Greasy Neale, whom Kellison served under as an assistant coach at West Virginia Wesleyan. When Neale and Kellison first played with Bulldogs, they assumed aliases for fear they’d be fired from their coaching jobs if it came out they were involved with pro football - at the time, most college presidents looked down upon the professional game. So for their first few years with the Bulldogs, Kellison took the name "Keller", while Neale took the name "Foster". When a delegation from West Virginia Wesleyan made surprise visit to a Bulldogs game in 1916 to investigate allegations of college football personnel playing professionally, Neale, Kellison and Pete Calac all got wind of the news and briefly left the team.

During his time in Canton Kellison and the Bulldogs won three Ohio League championships, in 1916, 1917 and 1919.

Coaching and administrative career
After his playing days, Kellison became the athletic director at Marietta College in Marietta, Ohio. He resigned from the position at Marietta to become the athletic director at Washington & Jefferson College in 1921. He later became the head coach for the William & Mary Tribe men's basketball team from 1929 to 1934 and again from 1937 to 1939.

Kellison was also the head coach for the William & Mary football team from 1931 to 1934, compiling a 21–17–2 record. In 1942 John was made an assistant coach, by Neale, for the Philadelphia Eagles. He was fired along with Neale after the 1950 season. Kellison became an assistant football coach for Washington & Lee in 1952.

Head coaching record

Football

Basketball

References

External links
 
 

1886 births
1971 deaths
American football centers
American football tackles
American men's basketball coaches
Canton Bulldogs players
Canton Bulldogs (Ohio League) players
Marietta Pioneers athletic directors
Marietta Pioneers baseball coaches
Philadelphia Eagles coaches
Richmond Spiders football coaches
Toledo Maroons players
Virginia Cavaliers football coaches
Virginia Tech Hokies football coaches
West Virginia Wesleyan Bobcats baseball players
West Virginia Wesleyan Bobcats football coaches
West Virginia Wesleyan Bobcats football players
Washington & Jefferson Presidents athletic directors
Washington & Jefferson Presidents football coaches
Washington and Lee Generals football coaches
William & Mary Tribe baseball coaches
William & Mary Tribe men's basketball coaches
William & Mary Tribe football coaches
High school football coaches in West Virginia
People from Pocahontas County, West Virginia
Coaches of American football from West Virginia
Players of American football from West Virginia
Baseball coaches from West Virginia
Baseball players from West Virginia
Basketball coaches from West Virginia